The Ridge Meadows Racers were founded by George Donatelli, father of the Olympic speed skater, Eden Green. The short track speed skating club has had a successful career, producing many high level skaters. They are based at the Planet Ice arena, in Maple Ridge, British Columbia, Canada.

Coaching 
The coaching is done by the Donatelli-Green family. Julian has coached many skaters to success, including Catriona Le May Doan.

External links
 

Maple Ridge, British Columbia
Speed skating clubs